This is an incomplete list of notable faculty at TU Delft .

B
Jan Hendrik de Boer, developer of crystal bar process
Johannes M. Bauer, Austrian communications professor
Johannes Bosscha, Dutch physicist and former director of TU Delft
Jacob B. Bakema, Dutch architect
Frits Bolkestein, Dutch politician and former European Commissioner
Nicolaas Govert de Bruijn, Dutch mathematician, known for De Bruijn graph and De Bruijn index
Martinus Willem Beijerinck, Dutch microbiologist and botanist and founder of virology
Jan Burgers, Dutch physicist, known for Burgers equation and Burgers vector

C
Jo Coenen, Dutch architect
Dirk Coster, Dutch physicist, co-founder of Hafnium

D
Jan Dietz, Dutch computer scientist
David van Dantzig, Dutch mathematician and co-founder of National Research Institute for Mathematics and Computer Science
Cees Dekker, Dutch scientist known for research on carbon nanotubes and molecular biophysics

E
Wiktor Eckhaus, Dutch mathematician known for Eckhaus instability and Eckhaus equation
Berend George Escher, Dutch geologist and former rector magnificus of University of Leiden
Aldo van Eyck, Dutch architect
Bruno Ninaber van Eyben, Dutch jewellery and industrial designer; designed the last series of Dutch guilder coins and the obverse side of all circulating Dutch euro coins

F
Bent Flyvbjerg, Danish urban planner
Tony Fretton, British architect

G
Johannes De Groot, Dutch mathematician
Marinus Jan Granpré Molière, Dutch architect

H
Majid Hassanizadeh, Iranian hydrogeologyst
Wander Johannes de Haas, Discoverer of Einstein–de Haas effect
Francine Houben, Dutch architect, co-founder of Mecanoo architects bureau
Vic Hayes, Dutch policy maker, father of WiFi
Herman Hertzberger, Dutch architect

K
Albert Jan Kluyver, a father of comparative microbiology
Hendrik Anthony Kramers, co-founder of National Research Institute for Mathematics and Computer Science
Gijs Kuenen, Dutch microbiologist 
Warner T. Koiter, Dutch mechanical engineer
Heike Kamerlingh Onnes, Dutch Nobel laureate in Physics, a discoverer of superconductivity
Ralph Kronig, German-American physicist and discoverer of particle spin
Alexander Rinnooy Kan, Dutch mathematician and economist 
Marc Koehler, Dutch architect
Frederik H. Kreuger, Dutch high voltage scientist and inventor
Alexander Rinnooy Kan, Dutch mathematician and business leader

L
D.G.H. Latzko, Austrian-born Dutch mechanical enigeer
Rehuel Lobatto, Dutch mathematician known for Gauss–Lobatto quadrature method
Harry Lintsen, Dutch professor of history of technology

M
Paul Mijksenaar, industrial designer, developer of visual information systems for John F. Kennedy International, LaGuardia and Schiphol airports
Gustaaf Adolf Frederik Molengraaff, Dutch geologist and discoverer of Bushveld complex
Marinus Jan Granpré Molière, Dutch architect, founder of Traditionalist School
Winy Maas, Dutch architect

O
Wubbo Ockels, Dutch astronaut, STS-61A Challenger crew member
Kas Oosterhuis, Dutch architect
Ootje Oxenaar, Dutch graphic designer

P
Hendrik Jacobus Prins, discoverer of the Prins reaction
Willem van der Poel, Dutch computer scientist
Hans B. Pacejka, Dutch expert in vehicle system dynamics
Balthasar van der Pol, Dutch electrical engineer
Dirk Polder, Dutch physicist known for Casimir-Polder force

R
Carmona Rodrigues, former mayor of Lisbon
Hendrik van Riessen, Dutch philosopher
Bob Van Reeth, Belgian architect
Hendrik van Riessen, Dutch reformational philosopher
Jacob van Rijs, Dutch architect

S
Henk G. Sol, Dutch organizational theorist
Dirk Jan Struik, Dutch-American mathematician
Thomas Joannes Stieltjes, Dutch mathematician and founder of Riemann–Stieltjes integral
Egbert Schuurman, Dutch reformation philosopher
Jan Arnoldus Schouten, Dutch mathematician

T
Antonia Terzi, Italian aerodynamicist
Bernard Tellegen, Dutch electrical engineer, inventor of penthode and gyrator
Alexander Tzonis, Greek architect

U
Johannes Herman Frederik Umbgrove, Dutch geologist

V
Marc de Vries, Dutch technologist
Henk van der Vorst, Dutch mathematician
Cees Veerman, Dutch politician
Jacq Firmin Vogelaar, Dutch novelist
Felix Andries Vening Meinesz, Dutch geophysicist and geodesist

W
Aaldert Wapstra, Dutch physicist
Ludwig Oswald Wenckebach, Dutch sculptor

Z
Friso de Zeeuw, Dutch politician

 
Delft University of Technology
Andy Zaidman, Professor Object Oriented Programming